The International Fleet Review 2013 was a review that took place on the week 3 to 11 October 2013, as part of the celebrations to commemorate the 100th anniversary of the entry of the first Royal Australian Navy fleet in Sydney Harbour, on 4 October 1913.

Background 

In 2011 the RAN invited over 50 nations to send a ship to participate in a fleet review to commemorate the centenary of the first entry in Sydney of the Australian Fleet. This event was considered a milestone in Australia’s maturity as a nation.
The event was planned in partnership with the New South Wales and the City of Sydney governments. The IFR was expected to have similar scale and public impact to that experienced during previous reviews held in Sydney, as the RAN 75th Anniversary (1986) and the Bicentennial Naval Salute (1988). It was also confirmed that Prince Harry would attend the IFR as part of his first official visit to Australia.

Some 40 warships and 16 tall ships were expected to participate in the review, of which a line of seven RAN ships symbolised the 1913 entry itself. The ships were greeted by the Governor-General of Australia, Quentin Bryce, from Bradleys Head on 4 October. She and Prince Harry officially reviewed the fleet on 5 October as part of the Ceremonial Fleet Review.

The tall ships departed on 10 October, and the warships did so on 11 October to take part in the naval exercise Triton Centenary.

Associated events 
In addition to the fleet review itself, the following events were scheduled to coincide with the IFR:

 IFR in Jervis Bay
 RAN Sea Power Conference 2013
 Pacific 2013 International Maritime Congress and Exposition
 Exercise TRITON CENTENARY
 International Fleet Review 2013 Art Competition

1913 Fleet entry 
On 21 June 1913, the battlecruiser HMAS Australia was commissioned at Portsmouth, and sailed towards Australia on 25 July 1913 accompanied by the also new light cruiser HMAS Sydney. On 2 October 1913 both ships arrived at Jervis Bay, New South Wales, where the rest of the Australian fleet joined them: the protected cruiser Encounter, the light cruiser Melbourne, and the destroyers Parramatta, Warrego, and Yarra.

On 4 October 1913 the ships, led by Australia, entered Sydney Harbour in an event that was witnessed by thousands of sightseers around the harbour, amidst nationalistic euphoria.

Events planned for the week 

A summary of the main events planned for the IFR 2013 week is listed below.

 3 October: Tall ships enter Sydney Harbour
 4 October: Warships enter Sydney Harbour
 4 October: RAN Helicopter Display Team & RAAF Roulettes
 4 October: Ceremonial Fleet Entry & 21-gun Salute
 5 October: Ceremonial Fleet Review by the Governor-General of Australia
 5 October: Formation flypast and Air Displays by civil and military helicopters and aircraft
 5 October: IFR Fireworks and Lightshow Spectacular
 6 & 7 October: Tall ships & Warships Open Days
 7 to 9 October: Sea Power Conference 2013 & Pacific 2013 International Maritime Exposition
 8 October: Freedom of Entry to Mosman CBD & Parramatta CBD
 9 October: Combined Navies Parade, Sydney CBD
 10 October: Tall ships depart Sydney Harbour
 10 October: International Fleet Review Sailing Regatta
 11 October: Warships depart Sydney Harbour

Participants 

As of 2 October 2013, the following participants from about 20 nations were confirmed.

Warships 
 Royal Australian Navy: 19 ships
 Other Navies: 18 ships from 17 navies

Tall ships 
 Australia: 10 ships
 Other countries: 6 ships, from 4 countries

Civilian ships 
 Australia: 3 ships, including the steam launch Lady Hopetoun which participated in the event of 1913.

Military aircraft 

 Royal Australian Navy: helicopters from 5 squadrons and the Heritage Flight
 Royal Australian Air Force: helicopters from 5 squadrons and the Roulettes display team
 Australian Army: helicopters from 1 squadron
 Other Air Forces: naval aircraft and helicopters from 4 nations

Civil aircraft 
 Aircraft and helicopters from 7 emergency services
 Vintage aircraft from the Historic Aircraft Restoration Society
 Privately owned aircraft

Bands 

Participating naval bands included:

 Royal Australian Navy Band
 RAN’s first Indigenous Performance Group
 Royal New Zealand Navy Band
 Her Majesty's Royal Marines Band
 Australian Navy Cadet Band, TS Hobart

Gallery

See also 
Fleet review (Commonwealth realms)
 International Fleet Review 2016

References

Notes

Bibliography

External links 

 RAN - IFR Home page
 International Tall Ship Festival 2013 Home Page
 International Maritime Exposition 2013 Home Page
 RAN Sea Power Conference 2013 Home Page
 IFR Image library
 IFR Art Competition website
 Australian National Maritime Museum webpage - Tall ships Open Day

Naval ceremonies
Royal Australian Navy